George Saunders (born 10 June 1989) is an English professional footballer who plays as midfielder for Colombian club Atlético Huila.

Club career
Born in London, Saunders joined the academy of Arsenal at the age of eight. He moved with his family to Spain, and was recruited by Villarreal, but was released by them, going on to join Torre Levante and then Espanyol. During this time he became the first British player to be called up to the Catalonia national football team. Ahead of the 2023 season, Saunders joiend Atlético Huila on a free transfer after seven years with Envigado.

Personal life
In October 2022, Saunders received Colombian citizenship.

References

External links

Meet George Saunders, the only English footballer in South America who's trying to become a Colombian World Cup star

1989 births
Living people
English expatriate footballers
English footballers
Expatriate footballers in Colombia
Envigado F.C. players
Patriotas Boyacá footballers
Fortaleza C.E.I.F. footballers
Unión Magdalena footballers
América de Cali footballers
CD Eldense footballers
Atlético Levante UD players
Villarreal CF C players
Categoría Primera A players
CF Torre Levante players
Association football midfielders
CF Damm players
English expatriate sportspeople in Colombia
Atlético Huila footballers